Ligovsky overpass is crossover, connect of Kirovsky (from the north) and Krasnoselsky (from the south) districts of Saint Petersburg through Prospekt Narodnogo Opolcheniya, stage tracks Ligovo-Dachnoye and Dudergofka river.